Sebastián Prediger (born September 4, 1986 in Crespo, Entre Ríos) is an Argentine football midfielder currently playing for Club Atlético Tigre.

Playing career

Club
Prediger began his career on youth side for Colón de Santa Fe and made his professional debut for Colón in a 1–0 defeat by Gimnasia de Jujuy on October 20, 2007.

He spend time on loan with Atlético Uruguay in the regionalized third division of Argentine football and in the Colombian club Millonarios. On July 27, 2009 F.C. Porto signed the Argentine midfielder from Colón de Santa Fe on a three-year deal and for around 3 million Euros. At the end of the January transfer window he was loaned out to Boca Juniors until the end of the season. On the 19th of August, Prediger was on loaned to Brazilian club Cruzeiro Esporte Clube.

In January 2014, Prediger signed a loan deal with UAE Arabian Gulf League side Baniyas.

International 
On May 20, 2009 Prediger made his international debut in a friendly match against Panama. He came on as a second-half substitute in the 3–1 win for the Argentina team, made up of players based in the Primera División Argentina.

Career statistics

Honours
Porto
Taça de Portugal: 2009–10

References

External links
 Argentine Primera statistics
 Sebastián Prediger at Soccerway

1986 births
Living people
Sportspeople from Entre Ríos Province
Argentine footballers
Argentina international footballers
Association football midfielders
Club Atlético Colón footballers
Boca Juniors footballers
Estudiantes de La Plata footballers
FC Porto players
Cruzeiro Esporte Clube players
Millonarios F.C. players
Baniyas Club players
Club Atlético Belgrano footballers
Newell's Old Boys footballers
San Martín de Tucumán footballers
Club Atlético Tigre footballers
Argentine people of Volga German descent
Argentine Primera División players
Primeira Liga players
UAE Pro League players
Argentine expatriate footballers
Expatriate footballers in Brazil
Expatriate footballers in Portugal
Expatriate footballers in Colombia
Expatriate footballers in the United Arab Emirates
Argentine expatriate sportspeople in Brazil
Argentine expatriate sportspeople in Portugal
Argentine expatriate sportspeople in Colombia
Argentine expatriate sportspeople in the United Arab Emirates